Joseph or Joe Stewart may refer to:

 Joseph Stewart (U.S. Army officer) (1822–1904), American army officer and commander of Alaska
 Joseph Stewart (Medal of Honor) (fl. 1865), American Civil War soldier and Medal of Honor recipient
 Joseph Spencer Stewart (1897–1934), American academic administrator, president of the University of North Georgia
 Joe Stewart (baseball) (1879–1913), American baseball pitcher
 Joe Stewart (politician) (Joseph Francis Stewart, 1889–1964), Irish politician
 JJ Stewart (John Joseph Stewart, 1923–2002), New Zealand rugby union coach 
 Joseph D. Stewart (1942–2019), American Marine Corps general
 Proposition Joe, fictional character in HBO TV series The Wire, real name Joe or Joseph Stewart